The 1968 Winter Olympics, officially known as the X Olympic Winter Games, was a winter multi-sport event held in Grenoble, France, from 6 to 18 February 1968. A total of 1,158 athletes representing 37 National Olympic Committees (NOCs) participated in 35 events from 10 different sports and disciplines.  The Olympic programme was largely unchanged from four years prior in Innsbruck; one event was added, a relay event in biathlon.

Norway won the most medals, with 14, and the most gold medals with 6. The Soviet Union finished second in both tallies, with 5 golds and 13 medals in total.  Of the 37 NOCs to participate at Grenoble, 15 won at least one medal, with 13 of those winning at least one gold medal.  East and West Germany entered separate teams for the first time, having competed together in the three prior Winter Olympics.  Both nations won gold medals, their first competing as different nations.  Czechoslovakia won its first gold Winter Olympics medal, achieved by Jiří Raška in the ski jumping normal hill event.   Romania won its first, and as of the 2018 Winter Olympics, only medal in a Winter Olympics in the two-man bobsleigh event.

Jean-Claude Killy of France was the most successful athlete at these games, winning all three of the men's alpine skiing events.  Two other athletes each won three medals: Sweden's Toini Gustafsson earned two golds and a silver, and Finland's Eero Mäntyranta won a silver and two bronzes. Both of them were competitors in cross-country skiing.  Four other athletes—Luciano de Paolis, Ole Ellefsæter, Harald Grønningen, and Eugenio Monti—won two gold medals, and 29 individuals in total won at least two medals in Grenoble.  In speed skating, three different events ended with ties for the silver medal position, one, the women's 500 metres ended in a three-way tie for silver.  In all three cases, multiple silver medals and no bronze medals were awarded.  In figure skating, American Peggy Flemming won the gold medal in ladies' singles; this came a mere seven years after the 1961 crash of Sabena Flight 548 that killed the entire US figure skating team.

Alpine skiing

Biathlon

Bobsleigh

Cross-country skiing

Figure skating

Ice hockey

Luge

Nordic combined

Ski jumping

Speed skating

Multiple medalists
Athletes who won three medals or two gold medals during the 1968 Winter Olympics are listed below.

Notes
 No bronze medal was awarded in this event because two competitors tied for second place with a time of 40.5 seconds.
 No bronze medal was awarded in this event because two competitors tied for second place with a time of 2 minutes 5.0 seconds.
 No bronze medal was awarded in this event because three competitors tied for second place with a time of 46.3 seconds.

See also
1968 Winter Olympics medal table

References

External links

The three women's 500 metre speed skaters on the podium

1968
Medal winners

Olympic